Ron Dearing UTC is a university technical college (UTC) which opened in September 2017 in Kingston upon Hull, East Riding of Yorkshire, England.

The UTC is sponsored by the University of Hull and local companies, and is named after the senior civil servant Ronald Dearing.

Founding partners 
KCOM
Reckitt Benckiser
Siemens Gamesa
Smith and Nephew
 Spencer Group
University of Hull

Major partners 
 APD
 Arco
 Centre For Digital Innovation
 Fujitsu
 Greenport Hull
 Ideal Boilers
 Orsted
 Sewell Group
 Sonoco Trident
Bonus
LUXINAR
Sauce
INEOS
Mira
KOHLER
Rada

Partners 
 Air Products
 AJ Building
 Baumer
 Emmerson-Kitney
 Horncastle
 Wykeland Group
HEALD

Location 
Ron Dearing UTC is located on Kingston Square, Kingston upon Hull. It is sited next door to Hull New Theatre.

Education 
Each day starts at 9:15 am and finishes at 5:15 pm. Depending on the students' individual timetable this may or may not be their start/finish times; this is the earliest start, and the latest finish. There are approximately 30 staff employed, who cover a range of subjects including Mechatronics, Electronics, Digital Technology, Creative Digital, Photography (Part of Creative Digital), Engineering, Maths, English, Sciences, and PE. Physical Education (PE) takes place offsite on Tuesdays due to site limitations and the lack of a grassy area or sports hall. These are lacking due to the location.

Extra-curricular 
The school has an extra-curricular program called 'enrichment'. Enrichment includes activities such as Sports, Combined Cadet Force and various clubs. On top of this, there are a number of other clubs such as the board games club and electronics club that are run on separate days to enrichment.

Combined Cadet Force 

The school has had a CCF contingent since its opening in 2017.

References

External links 
 https://www.rondearingutc.com

University Technical Colleges
Secondary schools in Kingston upon Hull